136 (one hundred [and] thirty six) is the natural number following 135 and preceding 137.

In mathematics
136 is itself a factor of the Eddington number. With a total of 8 divisors, 8 among them, 136 is a refactorable number. It is a composite number.

136 is a centered triangular number and a centered nonagonal number.

The sum of the ninth row of Lozanić's triangle is 136.

136 is a self-descriptive number in base 4, and a repdigit in base 16.

136 is a triangular number, because it's the sum of the first 16 positive integers.

In the military
 Force 136 branch of the British organization, the Special Operations Executive (SOE), in the South-East Asian Theatre of World War II
 USNS Mission Soledad (T-AO-136) was a United States Navy Mission Buenaventura-class fleet oiler during World War II
 USS Admirable (AM-136) was a United States Navy Admirable class minesweeper
 USS Ara (AK-136) was a United States Navy  during World War II
  was a United States Navy  during World War II
 USS Botetourt (APA-136) was a United States Navy  during World War II and the Korean War
  was a United States Navy tanker during World War II
  was a United States Navy  during World War II
  was a United States Navy heavy cruiser during World War II
 USS Frederick C. Davis (DE-136) was a United States Navy  during World War II
  was a United States Navy General G. O. Squier-class transport ship during World War II
 Electronic Attack Squadron 136 (VAQ-136) also known as "The Gauntlets" is a United States Navy attack squadron at Naval Air Station Atsugi, Japan
 Strike Fighter Squadron 136 (VFA-136) is a United States Navy strike fighter squadron based at Naval Air Station Oceana, Virginia

In transportation
 London Buses route 136 is a Transport for London contracted bus route in London

In TV and radio
 136 kHz band is the lowest frequency band amateur radio operators are allowed to transmit

In other fields
 The year AD 136 or 136 BC
 136 AH is a year in the Islamic calendar that corresponds to 753 – 754 CE
 136 Austria is a main-belt asteroid discovered in 1874
 WR 136 is a Wolf–Rayet red supergiant star
 136P/Mueller, or Mueller 3, is a periodic comet in our Solar System
Section 136 of the Mental Health Act 1983 (UK law) details removing a mentally ill person from a public place to a place of safety. It details police powers and the rights of someone in this position.
 Sonnet 136 by William Shakespeare

See also 
 List of highways numbered 136
 United Nations Security Council Resolution 136

External links

 136 cats (video)

References 

Integers